The Ormond Way is a walking and cycling route in development between Upperchurch in County Tipperary and Portumna in County Galway. It forms one of the stages of the Beara-Breifne Way, a walking and cycling route between the Beara Peninsula, County Cork and Blacklion, County Cavan, following the line of Donal Cam O'Sullivan Beare’s march of 1602.

References

Long-distance trails in the Republic of Ireland
Transport in County Galway
Transport in County Tipperary